Jack Clements Conway (July 30, 1918 – June 11, 1993) was a Major League Baseball infielder who played for four seasons. He played for the Cleveland Indians in 1941 and from 1946 to 1947, and the New York Giants in 1948.

External links

1918 births
1993 deaths
Major League Baseball infielders
Baseball players from Texas
Cleveland Indians players
Colorado Springs Sky Sox managers
New York Giants (NL) players
Indianapolis Indians players
Texas Longhorns baseball players